The Secret of NIMH 2: Timmy to the Rescue is a 1998 American direct-to-video animated musical adventure film produced by MGM Animation and the sequel to the 1982 animated film The Secret of NIMH. The plot, unrelated to Racso and the Rats of NIMH, the sequel to the book on which the original film was based, follows Timothy Brisby, the youngest son of Mrs. Brisby and her late husband, travels to Thorn Valley, hoping to become a hero like his father. There, he meets a young female mouse named Jenny and learns that the mice presumed dead during the NIMH escape are still alive, so they mount a rescue operation.

Unlike the first film, the sequel used digital ink and paint. Created without the support or input of the first film's director Don Bluth, it was panned by critics and fans of its predecessor.

Plot 
A prophecy tells how one of the children of Mrs. Brisby and her late husband, Jonathan, would save Thorn Valley from NIMH. Brisby's youngest son, Timothy, is chosen, but his older brother, Martin, believes he should have been. Martin decides to prove his worth and goes off to find his own adventure. Jeremy, the long-time acquaintance of the Brisby family, flies Timmy to Thorn Valley and is given a great welcome by its residents and becomes a student to Justin, the leader of the Rats of NIMH, and Mr. Ages. Over the years, Timmy is trained to overcome any challenge by adapting, improvising and thinking on his feet. Timmy hopes to one day become a great hero like his father, but has trouble listening to orders and thinking things through.

During a scavenger mission, Timmy meets a female mouse named Jenny McBride, whose parents were two of the mice that tried to escape from NIMH but were thought to have died; she explains that the mice in fact survived, but have been trapped ever since and also reveals the institute is preparing an unknown plan that will occur on the next full moon. Thorn Valley's council declares it would be too dangerous to save the mice, but Timmy decides to help Jenny after having since learned that Martin had also been captured. They manage escape by piloting a makeshift hot air balloon and begin their rescue mission to NIMH. During the journey, Timmy and Jenny begin to fall in love, but are attacked by a hawk and crash into the forest, where they meet a caterpillar con artist named Cecil, who scares the hawk away.

Seeking help, the group visit the Great Owl but instead find Jeremy posing as the Great Owl. Timmy and Jenny learn that Cecil has teamed up with Jeremy to trick the forest animals into paying them money but when their scheme is exposed, they escape with Timmy and Jenny in tow and travel to NIMH. Timmy and Jenny manage to sneak inside and find that the institute's experiments are worse than ever, turning rats and other creatures into obedient minions and the human scientists becoming animalistic.

Timmy and Jenny are reunited with Justin and the rats, who have come to help. Timmy is tasked to stand guard, but abandons his post to find Martin, causing everyone to be captured by a corrupted pair of stray cats, Muriel and Floyd. Timmy, Jenny and the others are taken to the head scientist, Doctor Valentine, only to find Martin is the true mastermind. Following his capture, Valentine turned Martin insane with his brainwashing device, but with his heightened intelligence, he took control of the lab after brainwashing Valentine and the others. Martin plans to use an army of lab rats riding a flock of pigeons to take over Thorn Valley and asks Timmy to join him, but he refuses. Timmy is detained, while Martin drags Jenny away to make her his queen and has the rats locked away.

Timmy begins to lose hope and blames himself for the situation until Cecil returns and encourages him not to lose hope as everyone makes mistakes. With renewed hope and determination, Timmy finds a way to escape and begins to devise a plan, taking all that he’s learned and finally begins thinking things through. Timmy manages to trap Muriel and Floyd and goes to rescue Jenny while Cecil frees the rats. Timmy saves Jenny, defeats Martin and tricks his army into flying in the wrong direction.

Timmy and Jenny then leave to find the others, only to find that a fire has broken out. The survivors flee, while Timmy goes back to save Martin, but not before he and Jenny profess their love for each other. On the way to Martin, Timmy is attacked by Muriel and Floyd, but he sends them down an elevator shaft to their deaths. Timmy eventually finds Martin and they are able to escape through the lab's skylight with some help from Jeremy, who then takes the group to safety. They return to Thorn Valley, where Martin has regained his sanity as Timmy receives a hero's welcome by its citizens and his family now that the prophecy has been fulfilled.

Cast

Reception 
Upon its release, the film received largely negative reviews by critics and fans of the first film. Entertainment Weeklys Marc Bernardin gave the sequel a C− grade and said: "Alas, this Bluth-less direct-to-tape sequel [...], about a mouse's transformation from misfit to hero, has none of the original's heart or craft, and all of the sappy songwriting and patchwork plotting common to further adventures". The Chicago Tribunes Harlene Ellin gave it one and a half stars out of four, adding that "the uninspired continuation [...] clearly wasn't worth the wait". The Radio Times panned the film's "sub-Saturday morning level of animation and art design", the "surprisingly grim tone", the "frenzied pace" and "extremely choppy" writing.

TV Guide gave the film two stars out of four.

Music 

The music for Timmy to the Rescue was composed by Lee Holdridge with lyrics by Richard Sparks, with an official soundtrack album released on compact disc on November 17, 1998 by Sonic Images. It contains 17 tracks featuring instrumental themes from the film performed by the Philharmonic Orchestra of London & Venezuela, including six vocal songs by various cast members.

Songs

References

External links 

 
 
 
 

1990s American animated films
1990s musical films
1998 animated films
1998 films
1998 direct-to-video films
American children's animated adventure films
American children's animated fantasy films
American children's animated musical films
Animated films about animals
Direct-to-video animated films
Direct-to-video sequel films
Films scored by Lee Holdridge
Animated films about mice
Metro-Goldwyn-Mayer animated films
Metro-Goldwyn-Mayer direct-to-video films
Animated films about rats
Films with screenplays by Jymn Magon
Rats of NIMH
Films directed by Dick Sebast
1990s children's animated films
Metro-Goldwyn-Mayer Animation films
1990s English-language films